Benedict is a patronymic surname, referring to the given name  Benedict, which comes from the Latin word meaning "blessed". The name was popularized by Saint Benedict of Nursia, the founder of the Order of Saint Benedict and thereby of Western Monasticism (Benedictine).

People with the surname Benedict
Bertram Benedict (c. 1892–1978), American author and editor
Brooks Benedict (1896–1968), American actor of the silent and sound film era
Bruce Benedict (born 1955), American former professional baseball player, coach and scout
Burton Benedict (1923-2010), American anthropologist
Charles Benedict (disambiguation), multiple people
Cleve Benedict (born 1935), U.S. Representative from West Virginia 2nd District, 1981–1983
Clare Benedict (1870–1961), American author
Clint Benedict (1892–1976), Canadian professional ice hockey goaltender
Dirk Benedict (pseudonym, born 1945), American actor
Ed Benedict (1912–2006), American animator and layout artist
Emma Lee Benedict (1857-1937), American editor, educator, author
Erastus C. Benedict (1800–1880), New York politician
George G. Benedict (1826–1907), Vermont newspaper editor and Medal of Honor recipient
Hester A. Benedict (1838-1921), American poet and writer
Heath Benedict (1983–2008), American football player
Jacques Benedict (1879–1948), American architect
Jim Benedict (born 1961), American baseball executive
John Benedict (1649–1729), member of the Connecticut House of Representatives from Norwalk
Sir Julius Benedict (1804–1885), English composer and conductor
Moby Benedict (born 1935), American baseball player and coach
Paul Benedict (1938–2008), American actor
Paul K. Benedict (1912–1997), American psychiatrist and linguist
Pinckney Benedict (born 1964), Writer of Appalachian fiction
Richard Benedict (1920–1984), Italian-born television and film actor and director
Rob Benedict (born 1970), American stage and screen actor
Ruth Benedict (1887–1948), American anthropologist
Ruth Sarles Benedict (1906–1996), American anti-war activist, researcher and journalist
Stanley Rossiter Benedict (1884–1936), American chemist who invented Benedict's reagent, a test for reducing sugars
Thomas Benedict (1617–1689), early settler in colonial New York, and Connecticut; member of the General Court of the Colony of Connecticut from Norwalk (1670, 1675)
Thomas Benedict (II) (1682–1763), member of the Connecticut House of Representatives of the Colony of Connecticut from Norwalk (1737, 1740, and 1744)
William Benedict (1917–1999), actor

Fictional characters
Eggs Benedict, a character in the Five Nights at Freddy's video game series
Julius and Vincent Benedict, characters in Twins
Phillium Benedict, villain of Recess: School's Out
Terry Benedict, character in Ocean's Eleven
Nicholas Benedict, character in The Mysterious Benedict Society

English-language surnames
Surnames from given names